Richard Harvey may refer to:

Music 
 Richard Harvey (composer) (born September 1953), British musician and composer known for his film and television soundtracks
 Richard Harvey (drummer), co-founding member of Australian rock band Divinyls

Sports
 Richard Harvey (American football) (born 1966), former American football linebacker
 Richard Harvey (footballer) (born 1969), English former football player
 Richard Harvey (cricketer) (born 1974), English cricketer
 Lefty Harvey (Richard Harvey, born 1890), American baseball player

Others
 Richard Harvey (astrologer) (1560–1630), English theologian and controversialist
 Richard Harvey (priest) (1864–1944), British clergyman
 Richard Harvey (politician) (born 1985), Australian politician
 Richard Harvey (scientist), professor of heart research at the University of New South Wales
 J. Richard Harvey, professor of accounting

See also
 Richard Harvey Chambers (1906–1994), United States federal judge
 Richard Hervy, MP for Lostwithiel